Kuczków may refer to the following places:
Kuczków, Kutno County in Łódź Voivodeship (central Poland)
Kuczków, Łowicz County in Łódź Voivodeship (central Poland)
Kuczków, Świętokrzyskie Voivodeship (south-central Poland)
Kuczków, Greater Poland Voivodeship (west-central Poland)